Koneenica Banerjee (born 21 May 1980 in Kolkata) is an Indian actress associated with Tollywood, predominantly appears in Bengali films and serials.

Early life

Koneenika is a commerce graduate from the Sivanath Sastri College, an affiliated college of the University of Calcutta. She started her acting career in a television. Her debut appearance was in a soap named Swapnanil telecasted in Zee Bangla. Her first big screen appearance was Moloy Bhattacharjee's film Tin Ekke Tin.

Filmography

Television films
Sources
 Aasma
 Neer Chhoto
 Notun Gaan
 Leela Chirantan
 Tomar Patho Cheye
 Maanbhanjan
 Kader Kuler Bou

Television series
 Ek Akasher Niche
 Swapnanil
 Kokhono Megh Kokhono Bristi
 Raat Bhor Brishti
 Ak Masher Gappo (Jhumur)
 Robi Thakurer Golpo in Colors Bangla
 Neel Simana
 Sarkar ki Duniya
 Andarmahal
 Aay Tobe Sohochori

Awards
 Anandalok Puroshkar of Critics Choice for Abar Ashibo Phire in 2004
 Kalakar Awards
"Sera Bouma" of Zee Bangla Sonar Sansar Award 2018 for playing the character of Parameshwari in Andarmahal.
"Sera Shashuri" of Star Jalsha Parivaar Award 2022 for playing the character of Sohochori Sengupta in Aay Tobe Sohochori.

See also 
 Ananya Chatterjee
 Debolina Dutta

References

Actresses from Kolkata
Indian film actresses
21st-century Indian actresses
Living people
Actresses in Bengali cinema
Sivanath Sastri College alumni
University of Calcutta alumni
1980 births
Kalakar Awards winners
Bigg Boss Bangla contestants